William Distin may refer to:

 William G. Distin, Adirondack Great Camp architect
 William L. Distin, Canadian municipal politician